Ross James McPherson (24 October 1938 – 4 September 2016) was a field hockey goalkeeper from New Zealand. He represented New Zealand at two Olympic Games, 1968 and 1972. He also played first-class cricket for  Northern Districts in the Plunket Shield.

References

External links
 

New Zealand male field hockey players
Olympic field hockey players of New Zealand
Field hockey players at the 1968 Summer Olympics
Field hockey players at the 1972 Summer Olympics
1938 births
2016 deaths
Field hockey players from Whangārei
New Zealand cricketers
Northern Districts cricketers